The State Research Center for Optics and Material Sciences (OPTIMAS) connects two areas of research for which the University of Kaiserslautern has a national and international reputation, founded upon relevant contributions to the development of laser physics, photonics and plasmonics. Researchers in Kaiserslautern have also been prominent in the development of magnetic, electronic and molecular materials, as well as thin films, nanostructures and ultracold quantum gases. In order to continue building on this research foundation, OPTIMAS has been established at TU Kaiserslautern within the framework of the research initiative of the state of Rhineland-Palatinate.

Research at OPTIMAS 
OPTIMAS combines natural and engineering sciences in the research areas of optics and material sciences. 
The participating researchers bring together their expertise in the areas of 
 quantum physics,
 applied optics,
 magnetism,
 surface physics,
 molecular and material sciences.
Their multifaceted projects include both fundamental and technologically oriented research, and fall under the general theme of "Light – Spin – Matter". Several OPTIMAS research objectives are thematically extremely broad and can only be pursued through the combination of multiple model-based and experimental approaches.
The "Light – Spin – Matter" core unites diverse cutting-edge research areas such as 
 spintronics,
 plasmonics,
 meta-materials,
 Bose-Einstein condensates and
 optical switches.
A typical example of the wide range of OPTIMAS research objectives is Spin Engineering.

This research area includes 
 spin chains,
 artificial materials such as ultra-cold gases,
 chemical systems such as poly-nuclear transition metal complexes,
 organic and inorganic semiconductors and
 ferromagnetic nanostructures.
Spin engineering also leads to applications, for example in the development of new materials for computer memory and novel sensors.

Members 
Research groups from four different departments at TU Kaiserslautern – Physics, Chemistry, Electrical and Computer Engineering, as well as Mechanical and Process Engineering – are members of OPTIMAS. Several additional research centers and institutions are also members: 
 the Nano Structuring Center TU Kaiserslautern,
 the Institut für Oberflächen- und Schichtanalytik (Institute for Surface Science and Thin-film Analysis, IFOS)
 the Institut für Verbundwerkstoffe (Institute for Composites Materials, IVW),
 the Department "Materials Characterization and Testing" of the Fraunhofer Institut für Physikalische Messtechnik (Fraunhofer Institute for Physical Measurement Techniques, Freiburg).
The balance between theoretical, experimental, and applied research groups is characteristic for the Research Center. Since OPTIMAS is a dynamic research association whose primary research themes are on a path of continuous development, its membership composition is likewise continuously adapting. 
Most of the scientists of OPTIMAS are in their international scientific community well known due to their publication activity in internationally journals (e.g. Nature, Proceedings of the National Academy of Sciences of the United States of America, Physical Review Letters, Journal of the American Physical Society, Angewandte Chemie, International Edition).
The current manager of operations at OPTIMAS is, Professor Martin Aeschlimann.

Transregional Collaborative Research Centers 
Under the roof of OPTIMAS five Transregional Collaborative Research Centers (CRC = Sonderforschungsbereich SFB) of the German Science Foundation (DFG) are operated:

 SFB/TRR 49 „Condensed Matter Systems with Variable Many-Body Interactions”, since 07/2007, together with University of Frankfurt and University of Mainz, as well as Max Planck Institute for Polymer Research, and
 SFB/TRR 88 3MET „Cooperative Effects in Homo- and Heterometallic Complexes“, since 01/2011, together with Karlsruhe Institute of Technology (KIT). 
 SFB 926 „Microscale Morphology of Component Surfaces (MICOS)“, since 07/2011; 
 SFB/TRR 173 Spin+X „Spin in its collective environment”, since 01/2016, together with University of Mainz; 
 SFB/TRR 185 OSCAR „Open System Control of Atomic and Photonic Matter“, since 07/2016, together with University of Bonn.

In addition, OPTIMAS is associated with the Graduate School of Excellence “Materials Science in Mainz (MAINZ)” which is coordinated by the University of Mainz. This graduate program is financed since 2007 in the framework of the German Universities Excellence Initiative.

Goals of OPTIMAS 
The strategic aim of OPTIMAS is to further advance research and education in the interdisciplinary areas of photonics, spintronics, molecular and magnetic functional materials, and nanostructures.
OPTIMAS is furthermore actively involved in the appointment of highly acclaimed scientists as well as in the recruitment of young scientists (e.g. Junior Professors). OPTIMAS supports the funding acquisition of its associated research groups by strengthening their research infrastructure, such as by maintaining and upgrading research equipment, and by interdisciplinary networking.

References

Sources 
Homepage OPTIMAS

Research institutes in Germany
Technical University of Kaiserslautern
Optics institutions